Together with Westergoa and Eastergoa Sudergoa was one of the three goaën of the Dutch province of Friesland during the Middle Ages.
From the 13th century on Sudergoa became a part of Westergoa.

Stavoren has been the centre of Sudergoa.

Geography of Friesland
History of Friesland